Caedocyon ("fit for cutting dog") is an extinct monospecific genus of bone crushing canid which inhabited western North America during the Oligocene 30.8—20.6 Ma, existing for approximately .

Like other members of the subfamily Hesperocyoninae, Caedocyon is a very primitive or apomorphic canid form, and its evolutionary position is not clear. It is, however, identified by having shortened upper premolars, enlarged caniniform upper third incisors, as well as reduced upper molars. Its simple, high premolars and the precision of its occlusion suggest a relation with Paraenhydrocyon. Known only from a single partial cranium, the dentition suggests the animal was a hypercarnivore or mesocarnivore.

References

Wang, X. 1994. Phylogenetic systematics of the Hesperocyoninae (Carnivora, Canidae). Bulletin of the American Museum of Natural History, 221:1-207.

Hesperocyonines
Oligocene canids
Miocene canids
Oligocene extinctions
Oligocene mammals of North America
Prehistoric carnivoran genera